Dolenice is a municipality and village in Znojmo District in the South Moravian Region of the Czech Republic. It has about 100 inhabitants.

Geography
It lies in a flat landscape in the Dyje–Svratka Valley.

History
The first written mention of Dolenice is from 1046.

Demographics

Sights
The most valuable monument is the Chapel of the Exaltation of the Holy Cross. This octagonal Baroque building dates from the end of the 17th century.

References

External links

Villages in Znojmo District